Jörg Dießner (born 25 February 1977 in Meissen) is a German former representative rower. He was a 2006 world champion in the German men's eight and a dual Olympian. He consistently represented in German senior crews at World Rowing Championships and Olympic Games between 1998 and 2006.

References 

 
 

1977 births
Living people
People from Meissen
Sportspeople from Saxony
Olympic rowers of Germany
Rowers at the 2000 Summer Olympics
Rowers at the 2004 Summer Olympics
World Rowing Championships medalists for Germany
German male rowers